Kahn-e Razan (also Romanized as Kahn-e Razān; also known as Kahn-e Zarān) is a village in Raviz Rural District, Koshkuiyeh District, Rafsanjan County, Kerman Province, Iran. At the 2006 census, its population was 17, in 7 families.

References 

Populated places in Rafsanjan County